The 1995 Orlando Predators season was the fifth season for the Orlando Predators. They finished the 1995 Arena Football League season 7–5 and ended the season with a loss in ArenaBowl IX against the Tampa Bay Storm.

Schedule

Regular season

Playoffs
The Predators were awarded the No. 6 seed in the AFL playoffs.

Standings

Awards

References

Orlando Predators seasons
1995 Arena Football League season
Orlando Predators Season, 1995